Henri is a 2013 Franco-Belgian drama film directed by Yolande Moreau. It was screened in the Directors' Fortnight section at the 2013 Cannes Film Festival. The film received four nominations at the 5th Magritte Awards, including Best Film and Best Director for Yolande Moreau.

Cast
 Pippo Delbono as Henri Salvatore
 Miss Ming as Rosette
 Jackie Berroyer as Bibi
 Simon André as René
 Lio as Rita
 Gwen Berrou as Laetitia
 Yolande Moreau as Aunt Michèle
 Philippe Duquesne as Jean-Lou
 Isabelle de Hertogh as Laetitia's friend
 Brigitte Mariaulle as Madame Monnier
 Renaud Rutten as Roland
 Pascal Demolon as Jean-Pierre
 Noël Godin as The pigeon friend
 Wim Willaert as The cop

References

External links
 

2013 films
2013 drama films
Belgian drama films
French drama films
2010s French-language films
French-language Belgian films
2010s French films